The 37th Film Independent Spirit Awards, honoring the best independent films and television series of 2021, were presented by Film Independent on March 6, 2022. Traditionally held the Saturday before the Academy Awards, the 2022 date marks a shift in the season, placing the Spirit Awards squarely in the corridor leading into Oscar voting. The nominations were announced on December 14, 2021 by actresses Beanie Feldstein, Regina Hall, and Naomi Watts. Returning to an in-person ceremony this year, the event was televised in the United States on IFC and streamed exclusively for subscribers by AMC+. Married couple Megan Mullally and Nick Offerman hosted the ceremony.

The grant recipients for the Emerging Filmmakers Awards were announced on February 10, 2022.

Winners and nominees

Film

{| class=wikitable style="width=100%"
|-
! style="width=50%" | Best Feature
! style="width=50%" | Best Director
|-
| valign="top" |
The Lost Daughter
 A Chiara
 C'mon C'mon
 The Novice
 Zola
| valign="top" |
Maggie Gyllenhaal – The Lost Daughter
 Janicza Bravo – Zola
 Lauren Hadaway – The Novice
 Mike Mills – C'mon C'mon
 Ninja Thyberg – Pleasure
|-
! style="width=50%" | Best Male Lead
! style="width=50%" | Best Female Lead
|-
| valign="top" |
Simon Rex – Red Rocket as Mikey Saber
 Clifton Collins Jr. – Jockey as Jackson Silva
 Frankie Faison – The Killing of Kenneth Chamberlain as Kenneth Chamberlain Sr.
 Michael Greyeyes – Wild Indian as Makwa
 Udo Kier – Swan Song as Pat Pitsenbarger
| valign="top" |
Taylour Paige – Zola as Aziah "Zola" King
 Isabelle Fuhrman – The Novice as Alex Dall
 Brittany S. Hall – Test Pattern as Renesha Bell
 Patti Harrison – Together Together as Anna
 Kali Reis – Catch the Fair One as Kaylee "K.O." Uppashaw
|-
! style="width=50%" | Best Supporting Male
! style="width=50%" | Best Supporting Female
|-
| valign="top" |
Troy Kotsur – CODA as Frank Rossi
 Colman Domingo – Zola as Abegunde "X" Olawale
 Meeko Gattuso – Queen of Glory as Pitt
 Will Patton – Sweet Thing as Adam
 Chaske Spencer – Wild Indian as Teddo
| valign="top" |
Ruth Negga – Passing as Clare Bellew
 Jessie Buckley – The Lost Daughter as Young Leda Caruso
 Amy Forsyth – The Novice as Jamie Brill
 Revika Reustle – Pleasure as Joy
 Suzanna Son – Red Rocket as Strawberry
|-
! style="width=50%" | Best Screenplay
! style="width=50%" | Best First Screenplay
|-
| valign="top" |
Maggie Gyllenhaal – The Lost Daughter
 Nikole Beckwith – Together Together
 Janicza Bravo and Jeremy O. Harris – Zola
 Mike Mills – C'mon C'mon
 Todd Stephens – Swan Song
| valign="top" |
Michael Sarnoski and Vanessa Block – Pig
 Sheldon D. Brown and Matthew Fifer – Cicada
 Lyle Mitchell Corbine Jr. – Wild Indian
 Shatara Michelle Ford – Test Pattern
 Fran Kranz – Mass
|-
! style="width=50%" | Best First Feature
! style="width=50%" | Best Documentary Feature
|-
| valign="top" |
7 Days
 Holler
 Queen of Glory
 Test Pattern
 Wild Indian
| valign="top" |
Summer of Soul (...Or, When the Revolution Could Not Be Televised)
 Ascension
 Flee
 In the Same Breath
 Procession
|-
! style="width=50%" | Best Cinematography
! style="width=50%" | Best Editing
|-
| valign="top" |
Eduard Grau – Passing
 Ante Cheng and Matthew Chuang – Blue Bayou
 Lol Crawley – The Humans
 Tim Curtin – A Chiara
 Ari Wegner – Zola
| valign="top" |
Joi McMillon – Zola
 Affonso Gonçalves – A Chiara
 Ali Greer – The Nowhere Inn
 Lauren Hadaway and Nathan Nugent – The Novice
 Enrico Natale – The Killing of Kenneth Chamberlain
|-
! colspan="2" style="width=50%" | Best International Film
|-
| colspan="2" valign="top" |
Drive My Car Compartment No. 6 ( /  /  / )
 Parallel Mothers
 Pebbles
 Petite Maman
 Prayers for the Stolen
|}

Films with multiple nominations and awards

Television
{| class=wikitable style="width=100%"
|-
! style="width=50%" | Best New Scripted Series
! style="width=50%" | Best New Non-Scripted or Documentary Series
|-
| valign="top" |Reservation Dogs (FX on Hulu) Blindspotting (Starz)
 It's a Sin (Channel 4)
 The Underground Railroad (Prime Video)
 We Are Lady Parts (Channel 4)
| valign="top" |Black and Missing (HBO) The Choe Show (FX)
 The Lady and the Dale (HBO)
 Nuclear Family (HBO)
 Philly D.A. (PBS)
|-
! style="width=50%" | Best Male Performance in a New Scripted Series
! style="width=50%" | Best Female Performance in a New Scripted Series
|-
| valign="top" |Lee Jung-jae – Squid Game as Seong Gi-hun (Netflix) Olly Alexander – It's a Sin as Ritchie Tozer (Channel 4)
 Murray Bartlett – The White Lotus as Armond (HBO)
 Michael Greyeyes – Rutherford Falls as Terry Thomas (Peacock)
 Ashley Thomas – Them: Covenant as Henry Emory (Prime Video)
| valign="top" |Thuso Mbedu – The Underground Railroad as Cora Randall (Prime Video) Deborah Ayorinde – Them: Covenant as Livia "Lucky" Emory (Prime Video)
 Jasmine Cephas Jones – Blindspotting as Ashley Rose (Starz)
 Jana Schmieding – Rutherford Falls as Reagan Wells (Peacock)
 Anjana Vasan – We Are Lady Parts as Amina (Channel 4)
|-
! colspan="2" style="width=50%" | Best Ensemble Cast in a New Scripted Series
|-
| colspan="2" valign="top" |Reservation Dogs – Paulina Alexis, Funny Bone, Lane Factor, Devery Jacobs, Zahn McClarnon, Lil Mike, Sarah Podemski, and D'Pharaoh Woon-A-Tai|}

Series with multiple nominations and awards

Special awards

John Cassavetes Award
(The award is given to the best feature made for under $500,000; award given to the writer, director, and producer)Shiva Baby
 Cryptozoo
 Jockey
 Sweet Thing
 This Is Not a War Story

Robert Altman Award
(The award is given to one film's director, casting director, and ensemble cast)

 Mass – Fran Kranz (director), Henry Russell Bergstein (casting director), Allison Estrin (casting director), Kagen Albright, Reed Birney, Michelle N. Carter, Ann Dowd, Jason Isaacs, Martha Plimpton, and Breeda WoolEmerging Filmmakers Awards

Producers Award
The award honors emerging producers who, despite highly limited resources, demonstrate the creativity, tenacity and vision required to produce quality, independent films. The award includes a $25,000 unrestricted grant.

 Lizzie Shapiro – Shiva Baby
 Brad Becker-Parton – Italian Studies
 Pin-Chun Liu – Test Pattern

Someone to Watch Award
The award recognizes talented filmmakers of singular vision who have not yet received appropriate recognition. The award includes a $25,000 unrestricted grant.

 Alex Camilleri – Luzzu
 Gillian Wallace Horvat – I Blame Society
 Michael Sarnoski – Pig

Truer than Fiction Award
The award is presented to an emerging director of non-fiction features who has not yet received significant recognition. The award includes a $25,000 unrestricted grant.

 Jessica Beshir – Faya Dayi
 Debbie Lum – Try Harder!
 Angelo Madsen Minax – North by Current

See also
 94th Academy Awards
 79th Golden Globe Awards
 75th British Academy Film Awards
 42nd Golden Raspberry Awards
 28th Screen Actors Guild Awards
 27th Critics' Choice Awards

References

External links
 

2021 film awards
2021 television awards
Independent Spirit Awards
2022 awards in the United States